Carolina Villagrán Moraga is a Chilean biologist known for her work on Quaternary biogeography. Her works include models for the past extent of different altitudinal zonations in Chile and on the origin of the Chilean flora. She is part of the Faculty of Science for the University of Chile.

See also
Arid Diagonal
Claudio Donoso
Ricardo Villalba
Edmundo Pisano
Valdivian temperate rain forest

Sources
 ACADÉMICOS DEPARTAMENTO DE BIOLOGíA
Publications

External links
(1/4) Carolina Villagrán: "Biodiversity, Biogeography and Evolution I"

Chilean biologists
Women biologists
Chilean educators
Chilean women educators
Living people
Palynologists
Chilean phytogeographers
Academic staff of the University of Chile
University of Göttingen alumni
Year of birth missing (living people)
Chilean women scientists